Teke zortlatmasi is a Turkish dance, with origins in Burdur, Isparta, Antalya, Denizli and Fethiye (Teke Region).
 The meter is 9/16.

See also
Zeybek dance

References

External links

Turkish dances
Turkish culture
Turkish folk dances